The 2021–22 Cupa României was the 19h season of the annual Romanian primary football knockout tournament.

Participating clubs
The following 36 teams qualified for the competition:

Round dates

Source:

First round
8 Liga III teams entered the First Round, and the games are scheduled for Sunday, 3 October.

Second Round/ Round of 32
The 4 teams that advanced from the First Round will be joined by the remaining teams: one Liga III team, 15 Liga II teams and 12 Liga I teams, for a total of 32 teams playing 16 matches.

Round of 16
The 16 qualified teams played the 8 matches on April 16 and 27.

Quarterfinals
The 8 qualified teams played the 4 matches on May 11.

Quarterfinals
The 4 qualified teams played the two matches on May 25.

Final
The final was played on June 5 on the Arcul de Triumf stadium.

References

Romania
Cupa României seasons